The 2019 Rally Chile (also known as the Copec Rally Chile 2019) was a motor racing event for rally cars that was held over four days between 9 and 12 May 2019. It marked the first running of Rally Chile, and was the sixth round of the 2019 World Rally Championship, World Rally Championship-2 and the newly-created WRC-2 Pro class. The 2019 event was based in Talcahuano of Concepción Province in Bío Bío Region and consists of sixteen special stages totalling  competitive kilometres.

Ott Tänak and Martin Järveoja won the first edition of Rally Chile. Their team, Toyota Gazoo Racing WRT, were the manufacturers' winners. The Škoda Motorsport crew of Kalle Rovanperä and Jonne Halttunen took the victory in the WRC-2 Pro category, finishing first in the combined WRC-2 category, while Takamoto Katsuta and Daniel Barritt won the wider WRC-2 class.

Background

Championship standings prior to the event
Thierry Neuville and Nicolas Gilsoul led both the drivers' and co-drivers' championships with a ten-point lead over six-time world champions Sébastien Ogier and Julien Ingrassia. Ott Tänak and Martin Järveoja were third, a further eighteen points behind. In the World Rally Championship for Manufacturers, Hyundai Shell Mobis WRT held a thirty-seven-point lead over Toyota Gazoo Racing WRT.

In the World Rally Championship-2 Pro standings, Łukasz Pieniążek and Kamil Heller held a four-point lead ahead of Gus Greensmith and Elliott Edmondson in the drivers' and co-drivers' standings respectively. Mads Østberg and Torstein Eriksen were third, eight points further back. In the manufacturers' championship, M-Sport Ford WRT led Citroën Total by seventy points, with Škoda Motorsport fourteen points further behind in third.

In the World Rally Championship-2 standings, Benito Guerra and Jaime Zapata led the drivers' and co-drivers' standings by three points respectively. Ole Christian Veiby and Jonas Andersson were second, following by Nikolay Gryazin and Yaroslav Fedorov in third.

Entry list
The following crews entered into the rally. The event was open to crews competing in the World Rally Championship, World Rally Championship-2, WRC-2 Pro and privateer entries not registered to score points in any championship. A total of sixty-three entries were received, with eleven crews entered with World Rally Cars and twenty-three entered the World Rally Championship-2. Four crews were nominated to score points in the Pro class.

Route
Chile has never previously hosted its own WRC round, so every stage is brand new.

Itinerary
All dates and times are CLT (UTC-3).

Report

World Rally Cars
The second stage of the brand new event was interrupted due to the safety reason, which affected Thierry Neuville, who was first on the road. As a result, the Belgian was awarded a notional time. In the afternoon loop, Ott Tänak stormed away and held a 22.4-second lead into Saturday.

The second leg was quite dramatic. Kris Meeke rolled his Yaris in the opening stage of the day. He managed to carry on, but valuable time has been lost, which dropped him down to tenth overall at the end of the day. One stage later, championship leader Neuville crashed violently after a right-hand blind crest, badly damaging his i20. Luckily, the Belgian and his co-driver Nicolas Gilsoul were fine, but they were unable to continue the rally. The battle for the final podium was on fire until Jari-Matti Latvala hit a rock in the final test and broke his Toyota's driveshaft, which elevated nine-time world champion Sébastien Loeb to third, just 5.1 seconds off defending world champion Sébastien Ogier, who was half a minute behind rally leader Tänak. Eventually, Tänak took the rally victory, following by Ogier, who managed to keep Loeb behind, in second.

Classification

Special stages

Championship standings

World Rally Championship-2 Pro
Kalle Rovanperä led in the Pro category with a slender 2.4-second advantage after an intense battle with Mads Østberg. The eighteen-year-old Finn extended his lead over Østberg as the Norwegian lost 30 seconds when fluid leaked out of the rear brakes of his C3 R5. Eventually, Rovanperä successfully took his first Pro victory of the season.

Special stages
Results in bold denote first in the RC2 class, the class which both the WRC-2 Pro and WRC-2 championships run to.

Classification

Championship standings

World Rally Championship-2
Three-time European Rally Champion Kajetan Kajetanowicz was initially entered for the event, but due to the mechanical issues in Rally Argentina, he and his team withdrew from Chile.

Local hero Alberto Heller was comfortable in the lead, but his brother Pedro Heller had to retire from the day as he rolled his Fiesta in the opening stage. However, Alberto was surpassed by Takamoto Katsuta in final stage of the second leg. Worse still, the Chilean rolled his Ford Fiesta into retirement in the second to last stage. Eventually, Katsuta brought car home to take his first victory of the season.

Classification

Special stages
Results in bold denote first in the RC2 class, the class which both the WRC-2 Pro and WRC-2 championships run to.

Championship standings

Notes

References

External links
  
 2019 Rally Chile in e-wrc website
 The official website of the World Rally Championship

Chile
2019 in Chilean sport
May 2019 sports events in South America
2019